CJQM-FM (Country 104.3) is an FM radio station in Sault Ste. Marie, Ontario. The station is owned and operated by Rogers Sports & Media and broadcasts a country format. With 100,000 watts power, CJQM's signal is one of the strongest in the Sault Ste. Marie area, and can be heard northward to Montreal River and southward to Mackinaw City, Michigan and at times to Gaylord.

History

The station was launched on May 13, 1965 as CKCY-FM by Algonquin Broadcasting, the owners of the city's CKCY-AM. In 1976, both stations were acquired by Huron Broadcasting, who also launched CKCY-TV in 1978. Huron subsequently sold the radio stations to a new business consortium, CKCY 920 Ltd., in 1985. The station adopted its current callsign that year, as well as its longtime "Q104" branding. CKCY 920 Ltd. was subsequently acquired by Mid-Canada Radio in 1988, and Mid-Canada in turn was acquired by the Pelmorex Radio Network in 1990.

Due to the economic circumstances of the Sault Ste. Marie market, with competition from stations in Sault Ste. Marie, Michigan severely curtailing the profitability of the Ontario stations, Pelmorex shut down CKCY in 1992. The company then entered into a local management agreement with Telemedia, taking over management of that company's CHAS-FM and making CHAS and CJQM sister stations, an arrangement that continues to this day. Telemedia subsequently acquired the Pelmorex group in 1999.

Telemedia was acquired by Standard Broadcasting in 2002, with Standard selling both CJQM and CHAS to their current owner, Rogers Media, the same year. Rogers Media would drop CJQM's longtime "Q104" branding on June 28, 2013, rebranding the station as Country 104.3, part of an effort by Rogers to apply a unified "Country" branding to its roster of country music-formatted stations.

The "Country 104.3" playlist emphasizes current country songs and artists, with a few classic country titles sprinkled in (the station has its own classic country show on Sunday mornings). The schedule also features a live local morning show hosted by Jeff McNiece, as well as syndicated weekly shows including American Country Countdown and Canadian Country Spotlight. CJQM was formerly radio home to the Ontario Hockey League's Sault Ste. Marie Greyhounds, a relationship that ended after the 2008-2009 season; the Greyhounds are currently heard on Sault Ste. Marie, Michigan-based WSUE.

After more than 30 years, Jeff McNeice retired and signed off at CJQM in 2021. He became the last local radio show host on the Canadian side of the St.Mary's River. All local programming had been phased out earlier, including locally produced news and sports, in favour of amalgamating the stations formats from Ottawa and other Rogers Owned Country stations.

References

External links
 Country 104.3
 

Radio stations in Sault Ste. Marie, Ontario
Rogers Communications radio stations
Country radio stations in Canada
CJQM
1965 establishments in Ontario